Lynbrook is a Long Island Rail Road commuter train station in Lynbrook, New York. The station is located at the intersection of Sunrise Highway and Peninsula Boulevard and is located on the railroad's Montauk Branch and Long Beach Branch lines and is served by Long Beach Branch trains and select weekday Babylon Branch trains. The station is elevated and is wheelchair accessible through elevator access.

History
Lynbrook was opened as Pearsall's Corner  on October 28, 1867, by the South Side Railroad of Long Island. The name became Pearsall's in April 1875 and later became Lynbrook in 1893. In 1880 the station became the northern terminus of the New York and Long Beach Railroad (NY&LB), a railroad line that was acquired by the LIRR and became the Long Beach Branch in 1904. The "PT Tower" opened alongside the NY&LB, controlled the junction with the Montauk Branch until 1910, when Long Beach Branch tracks were extended to Valley Stream station. The station was rebuilt in 1881, electrified on September 8, 1910, and then remodeled sometime in 1920, only to be razed in 1938 as part of a decades-long grade crossing elimination project along the Montauk, Atlantic and Babylon branches.

Platforms and tracks
This station has two high-level island platforms. The 12-car north platform is served by Babylon Branch trains, while the 10-car south platform is served by Long Beach Branch trains. The pairs of tracks split just east of the station.

References

External links

Arrt's Arrchives
Lynbrook/Pearsall's Corner Station History
1910 Lynbrook Station post card
 Station from Google Maps Street View
Platforms from Google Maps Street View
Waiting Room from Google Maps Street View

Long Island Rail Road stations in Nassau County, New York
Railway stations in the United States opened in 1867
1867 establishments in New York (state)